Cilycwm is an electoral ward, representing the communities of Cilycwm, Llansadwrn and Llanwrda, Carmarthenshire, Wales.

Profile
In 2014, the Cilycwm electoral ward had an electorate of 1,211. The total population was 1,486, of whom 57.4% were born in Wales. The 2011 census indicated that 46.0% of the population were able to speak Welsh.

Current Representation
The Cilycwm Ward is a single-member ward for the purposes of Carmarthenshire County Council elections. Since 1995 it has been represented by Independent councillor Tom Theophilus.

Recent history
The first election to the new unitary Carmarthenshire County Council took place in 1995. At this stage the ward also included the communities of Cynwyl Gaeo and Talley. Tom Theophilus, a long-serving district and county councillor was elected.

In 1999 the seat - now on its current boundaries was held by Tom Theophilus.

In 2004 the sitting member was again returned.

In 2008, the seat was again held by the sitting member.

By the 2012 Tom Theophilus, who had represented the area for decades narrowly held the seat against one of the most prominent opponents of the previous administration and a leading critic of Mark James, the Chief Executive of the Council.

History

County Council Elections
An area roughly equating to the current ward elected a member to Carmarthenshire County Council from 1889 until its abolition in 1974. The ward was known as Newcastle Emlyn.

With the formation of Dyfed County Council, Cilycwm was part of the Llandeilo Rural No.1 Ward (which included the former borough of Llandovery. This ward was renamed Llandovery in 1989.

When the unitary Carmarthenshire County Council was formed in 1995 a new Cilycwm ward was formed and its boundaries changed in 1999. It was now similar to the ward that existed between 1889 and 1974.

District Council Elections
From 1973 until 1996, Cilycwm formed an electoral ward for the purposes of elections to Dinefwr Borough Council.

External links

References

Carmarthenshire electoral wards